Hemidactylus puccionii, also known commonly as the Somali plain gecko and the Zanzibar leaf-toed gecko,  is a species of lizard in the family Gekkonidae. The species is endemic to Somalia.

Etymology

The specific name, puccionii, is in honor of Italian naturalist Nello Puccioni (1881–1937).

Geographic range
H. puccionii is endemic to Somalia. Earlier records from Kenya and Zanzibar (Tanzania) refer to other species.

Reproduction
H. puccionii is oviparous.

References

Further reading
Calabresi E (1927). "Anfibi e rettili raccolti nella Somalia dai Proff. G. Stefanini e N. Puccioni (gennaio – luglio 1924) [= Amphibians and Reptiles Collected in Somalia by Professors G. Stefanini and N. Puccioni (January – July 1924)]". Atti della Società Italiana di Scienze Naturali e del Museo Civico di Storia Naturale di Milano 66: 14–60. (Hemidactylus puccionii, new species, p. 23). (in Italian).
Lanza B (1990). "Amphibians and reptiles of the Somali Democratic Republic: checklist and biogeography". Biogeographia 14: 407–465.
Rösler H (2000). "Kommentierte Liste der rezent, subrezent und fossil bekannten Geckotaxa (Reptilia: Gekkonomorpha)" Gekkota 2: 28–153. (Hemidactylus puccionii, p. 87). (in German).

Hemidactylus
Geckos of Africa
Reptiles of Somalia
Endemic fauna of Somalia
Reptiles described in 1927